Proceno is a  (municipality) in the Province of Viterbo in the Italian region of Latium, located about  northwest of Rome and about  northwest of Viterbo.   

Proceno borders the following municipalities: Acquapendente, Castell'Azzara, Piancastagnaio, San Casciano dei Bagni, Sorano.
 
Saint Agnes of Montepulciano established a monastery here.

References

External links
 Tuscia 360 about Proceno with VR panoramas

Cities and towns in Lazio